Ahmad Amiruddin (born 3 October 1982 in Bone, Sulawesi Selatan) is a retired Indonesian footballer. He normally plays as a striker and his height is 173 cm.

International career
Amiruddin played in two matches for the Indonesia national football team at the 2006 Merdeka Tournament. He was also a squad member at the 2007 ASEAN Football Championship, but did not appear in any matches. Amiruddin was named as a reserve for the Asian Cup 2007, but did not appear in any matches.

References

External links

1982 births
Living people
Bugis people
People from Bone Regency
Indonesian footballers
Indonesia international footballers
2007 AFC Asian Cup players
Liga 1 (Indonesia) players
Indonesian Premier League players
PSM Makassar players
Persiram Raja Ampat players
Arema F.C. players
Deltras F.C. players
Mitra Kukar players
Association football forwards
Association football wingers